Rose of Cimarron is the ninth studio album by the American country rock band Poco, released in 1976.

Background
Former Loggins & Messina sax/fiddle player Al Garth joined the band to record this album, but left shortly after due to internal conflicts.  The title track became one of the band's signature songs, and was later recorded by Emmylou Harris on her album, Cimarron.  The band's old label, Epic Records, released Poco Live just one month before Rose of Cimarron, causing confusion among listeners and helping sales of the former at the expense of the latter.

Reception

In his Allmusic review, music critic James Chrispell wrote of the album; "The country influence is nearly abandoned except for the Rusty Young tune "Company's Comin'/Slow Poke." There are great tunes with great arrangements throughout."

Track listing
"Rose of Cimarron" (Rusty Young) – 6:42
"Stealaway" (Young) – 3:12
"Just Like Me" (Timothy B. Schmit) – 2:45
"Company’s Comin’" (Young) – 2:39
"Slow Poke" (Young) – 2:04
"Too Many Nights Too Long" (Paul Cotton) – 5:59
"P.N.S. (When You Come Around)" (Cotton) – 3:15
"Starin’ at the Sky" (Schmit, John Logan) – 2:58
"All Alone Together" (Cotton) – 3:21
"Tulsa Turnaround" (Cotton) – 2:40

Charts

Track-by-Track Personnel
"Rose of Cimarron"
 Rusty Young – acoustic and 12-string electric guitars, mandolin, banjo, dobro
 Timothy B. Schmit – vocals, bass, harmonica
 Paul Cotton – vocals, electric and acoustic guitars
 George Grantham – vocals, drums, timpani
 Mark Henry Harman – celesta
 Milt Holland – percussion
 Tom Sellers – grand piano, string arrangements
 Sid Sharp – concertmaster
"Stealaway"
 Rusty Young – electric and acoustic guitars, banjo
 Timothy B. Schmit – vocals, bass
 Paul Cotton – vocals, lead electric and acoustic guitars
 George Grantham – vocals, drums
"Just Like Me"
 Timothy B. Schmit – vocals, bass
 Paul Cotton – vocals, acoustic and electric guitars
 George Grantham – vocals, drums
 Rusty Young – pedal steel guitar
"Company's Comin'/Slow Poke"
 Rusty Young – vocals, banjo, dobro, mandolin, pedal steel guitar, hand claps
 Paul Cotton – vocals, electric and acoustic guitars, hand claps
 Timothy B. Schmit – vocals, bass, hand claps
 George Grantham – vocals, drums, hand claps
 John Logan – banjo
 Al Garth – fiddle
 Milt Holland – washboard
 Annie Emery – hand claps
 Jenny Grantham – hand claps
 Jennifer O'Keefe – hand claps
 Doug Rider – hand claps
 Jeddrah Schmit – hand claps
 Noreen Schmit – hand claps
"Too Many Nights Too Long"
 Paul Cotton – vocals, Spanish guitar, 6 and 12-string electric guitars
 Timothy B. Schmit – vocals (including Spanish), bass
 George Grantham – vocals, drums
 Rusty Young – mandolin
 Al Garth – violin
 Steve Ferguson – acoustic piano
 Milt Holland – marimba, percussion
"When You Come Around"
 Paul Cotton – vocals, electric and acoustic guitars
 George Grantham – vocals, drums
 Timothy B. Schmit – vocals, bass
 Rusty Young – pedal steel guitar
 Al Garth – fiddle
 Steve Ferguson – acoustic piano
"Starin' at the Sky"
 Timothy B. Schmit – vocals, bass
 George Grantham – vocals, drums
 Paul Cotton – 12 and 6-string acoustic guitars
 Rusty Young - mandolin
 John Logan – banjo
 Al Garth – alto saxophone
 Steve Ferguson – electric piano
"All Alone Together"
 Paul Cotton – vocals, 6 and 12-string acoustic guitars
 George Grantham – vocals, drums
 Rusty Young – pedal steel guitar
 Timothy B. Schmit – vocals, bass
 Al Garth – fiddle
 Steve Ferguson – acoustic piano
"Tulsa Turnaround"
 Paul Cotton – vocals, acoustic guitar
 Rusty Young – dobro
 George Grantham – drums
 Timothy B. Schmit – bass
 Al Garth – fiddle
 Steve Ferguson – acoustic piano

Production 
 Poco – producers
 Mark Henry Harman – producer, engineer 
 Doug Rider – engineer 
 Wally Traugott – mastering 
 Capitol Mastering (Hollywood, California) – mastering location 
 Phil Hartman – art direction, design 
 Tom Wilkes – art direction, design 
 Sandy Sussman – color reproduction 
 Guy Webster – photography 
 Dennis Jones – road manager

References

Poco albums
1976 albums
ABC Records albums